Johann Sebastian Bach composed the church cantata  (Adorn yourself, O dear soul), 180, in Leipzig for the 20th Sunday after Trinity and first performed it on 22 October 1724.

The chorale cantata is based upon Johann Franck's hymn "", with a melody by Johann Crüger, a hymn for the Eucharist. It matches the Sunday's prescribed reading, the Parable of the Great Banquet from the Gospel of Matthew. The first and last stanza are used unchanged in both text and tune: the former is treated as a chorale fantasia, the latter as a four-part closing chorale. An unknown librettist paraphrased the inner stanzas as recitatives and arias, quoting one stanza of the hymn within a recitative. Bach scored the cantata for four vocal soloists, a four-part choir, and a Baroque instrumental ensemble of different flutes and oboes, strings and continuo. All movements are set in the major mode, in keeping with the festive text, and several movements resemble dances.

History and words 
Bach wrote the cantata in his second year in Leipzig as part of his second annual cycle of chorale cantatas for the 20th Sunday after Trinity. The prescribed readings for the Sunday were from the Epistle to the Ephesians—"walk circumspectly, ... filled with the Spirit"—(), and from the Gospel of Matthew, the Parable of the Great Banquet.

The hymn is sung during a service in preparation for the holy communion, and imagines a bride getting ready for her wedding. An unknown author kept the text of the first, middle and last stanzas (1, 4, and 9), and paraphrased the other stanzas to arias and recitatives: stanzas 2 and 7 to arias; stanzas 3, 5–6 and 8 to recitatives. He stayed close to the original and did not seek closer relation to the readings than given by the general context.

Bach composed the cantata subsequent to his chorale prelude of the same name, BWV 654, part of his Great Eighteen Chorale Preludes. He led the first performance of the cantata on 22 October 1724.

Music

Structure and scoring 
Bach structured the cantata in seven movements. The text and tune of the hymn are kept in the outer choral movements, a chorale fantasia and a four-part closing chorale, which frame a sequence of recitatives and  arias, one recitative with a chorale cantus firmus. Bach scored the work for four vocal soloists (soprano, alto, tenor, bass), a four-part choir and a Baroque instrumental ensemble of two recorders (Fl), flauto traverso (Ft), two oboes (Ob), two violins (Vl), viola (Va), violoncello piccolo (Vp) and basso continuo. The title page of the autograph score reads: "CONCERTO. / Dominica 20 post Trinit: / Schmücke dich o liebe Seele etc. / a 4 Voci / Traversiere / 2 Flauti. / 2 Hautbois / 2 Violini / Viola. / Continuo / di / Signore / Joh:Seb:Bach."

In the following table of the movements, the scoring follows the Neue Bach-Ausgabe. The keys and time signatures are taken from Alfred Dürr, using the symbol for common time (4/4). The continuo, playing throughout, is not shown.

Movements 
The Eucharistic hymn, with a tune that alternates in an intriguing way between phrases of two and three measures, appears in three movements, the opening chorale fantasia, within a recitative and as the closing four-part chorale. Compared to the early cantata for the same occasion, Bach stresses the invitation of God and the joy of the banquet, rather than the possibility of man's failing to respond to the invitation. Alfred Dürr compares the opening chorus and both arias to dances: movement 1 to a gigue, movement 2 to a bourrée, and movement 5 to a polonaise. All movements are set in the major mode. The inner movements are distinguished by their obbligato instruments. The musicologist Julian Mincham notes the work’s "gentle, pastoral quality of great delicacy and refinement, ... charm, grace and a suggestion of fragility”.

1 
The opening chorus, "" (Adorn yourself, beloved soul). is an orchestral concerto with the vocal parts embedded, the soprano singing the cantus firmus of the tune by Johann Crüger. The movement shares the “gentle" key of F major with three other works from the cycle of chorale cantatas: the first, O Ewigkeit, du Donnerwort, BWV 20, a French overture on the themes such as eternity and confusion; Herr Christ, der einge Gottessohn, BWV 96, a pastorale composed two weeks earlier; and later the last one, Wie schön leuchtet der Morgenstern, BWV 1, a tone poem using the image of the morning star. The four movements contrast in character, but have in common that they express "an elusive personal connection". John Eliot Gardiner, who conducted the Bach Cantata Pilgrimage in 2000, sees the "relaxed 12/8 processional movement" as "perfectly tailored to the idea of the soul dressing itself up in all its wedding finery". Mincham observes subtle aspects of conveying the message, such as the use of minor mode indicating, the development of the ritornello motif from notes of the first line of the chorale tune, and the significance for not only an individual soul but “for all humanity" by entries of the lower voices in ever-changing sequence.

2 
A transverse flute accompanies the tenor voice in the aria "" (Be lively now, your Savior knocks). The knocking is expressed in repeated notes. Throughout the movement, a motif identified by Albert Schweitzer as a joy motif pictures an "almost breathless expression of personal euphoria".

3 
A violoncello piccolo complements the soprano in a recitative, which begins as a secco recitative, "" (How dear are the gifts of the holy meal), and leads to the fourth stanza of the chorale, "" (Ah, how my spirit hungers), sung in a moderately adorned version of the tune. Bach uses recitative to introduce the chorale by evoking the "gift of communion", while the chorale stanza expresses the longing for this gift, mentioning thirst and hunger. The melody sounds sometimes like a new melody, expressing that a personal longing. The violoncello piccolo in continuous motion "envelops the soprano's voice in a quasi womb-like blanketing of divine reassurance",as Mincham phrases it.

4 
Two recorders reflect the text of the alto recitative, "" (My heart feels within itself fear and joy). which develops to an arioso, with the recorders first playing just long chords, and then gradually adding motion. Bach expresses joy ("'’) in an extended melisma on the word.

5 
The full orchestra supports the soprano in the second aria, "" (Sun of life, light of the senses). Mincham describes the da capo aria as "joyously ebullient". The short middle section of the aria touches minor keys.

6 
The last recitative, "" (Lord, let Your faithful love for me), is secco, but closes as an arioso on the words "" (and considers your love constantly). It is a prayer to God to both love the petitioner and evoke a "reciprocal affection."

7 
The closing chorale, "" (Jesus, true bread of life), is set for four parts.

Recordings 
The entries for the table are taken from the selection on Bach Cantatas Website. Groups with one voice per part (OVPP) and ensembles playing period instruments in historically informed performance are marked by green background.

References

Sources 
 
 Schmücke dich, o liebe Seele BWV 180; BC A 149 / Chorale cantata (20th Sunday after Trinity) Bach Digital
 BWV 180 Schmücke dich, o liebe Seele: English translation, University of Vermont
 Luke Dahn: BWV 180.7 bach-chorales.com

Church cantatas by Johann Sebastian Bach
1724 compositions
Chorale cantatas